The Khasadar (Arabic أَمين for Keeper/Guardian) were paramilitary forces operating throughout the Federally Administered Tribal Areas (FATA), now a part of Khyber Pakhtunkhwa province in Pakistan. The Khasadar were a locally recruited and maintained tribal security forces, paid for through a stipend provided directly to their tribes by the Pakistani government. 40,000 Khasadar served seven former tribal agencies and six frontier regions.

Members of the force were recruited as volunteers or through family connections. Khasadar officers are called subedars. Khasadars receive 17,400 Rs.

Origin of the Khasadars
Khasadadars were first raised in Waziristan and other North West Frontier districts of British India prior to World War I. Their prime functions during this period included the provision of picquets and escorts to protect camel convoys and other travellers when regular soldiers of the Indian Army were not available. They wore the normal clothing of the tribal groups from which they were recruited, distinguished by arm bands bearing the letter K.

Post FATA-KP merger
Pakistan's Express Tribune claims that as of 25 June 2018 there were only 17,965 Khasadars in the tribal districts and sub-divisions, and that the current plan is to reduce the force to 15,000, through the immediate retirement of those eligible. It also stated that 2,500 Khasadars could be offered a severance package while about 9,000 will be retrained and merged into the Levies Force. The remaining 3,500 long-serving Khasadars may be allowed to complete their service until retirement.

April 08, 2019, Khyber Pakhtunkhwa's Chief Minister, Mahmood Khan, stated that the  28,000 personnel of the Levies and the Khasadar were merged into the Khyber Pakhtunkhwa Police. Adviser to Chief Minister on Tribal Districts, Ajmal Khan Wazir, stated that Khasadars will receive the same designations, entitlements and postings as members of the regular police force. The Official Notice implied a period of six months for the assimilation process.

See also
 Law enforcement in Pakistan
 Armed forces of Pakistan
 Pakistan Levies

References

Former paramilitary forces of Pakistan
Law enforcement agencies of Pakistan
Federally Administered Tribal Areas
1892 establishments in British India
2019 disestablishments in Pakistan